Landal is one of twelve civil parishes (freguesias) in the municipality of Caldas da Rainha, Portugal.

References

Freguesias of Caldas da Rainha